Reacting to protests during the Vietnam War era, the United States 90th Congress enacted Public Law 90-381 (82 Stat. 291), later codified as 18 U.S.C. 700, et. seq., and better known as the Flag Protection Act of 1968.  It was an expansion to nationwide applicability of a 1947 law previously restricted only to the District of Columbia (See 61 Stat. 642).

In 1989, the 101st Congress amended that statute with Public Law 101-131 (103 Stat. 777). These amendments to the statute were in response to the United States Supreme Court's ruling that year in the case of Texas v. Johnson (491 U.S. 397). On June 11, 1990, the Supreme Court in the case of United States v. Eichman struck down the Flag Protection Act, ruling again that the government's interest in preserving the flag as a symbol does not outweigh the individual's First Amendment right to disparage that symbol through expressive conduct.

Text
The text of the law reads:

See also
 Flag desecration

References

1968 in law
United States federal legislation
Flag controversies in the United States